The 2014 Canoe Marathon European Championships were the eleventh edition of the Canoe Marathon European Championships, which took place between 13 and 15 June 2014 in Piešťany, Slovakia. The competition was staged on the Váh river and consisted of fifteen events – ten in kayak and five in canoe – divided in junior, under-23 and senior categories.

Medalists

Juniors

Under–23

Seniors

Medal table

References

Canoe Marathon European Championships
Canoe Marathon European Championships
International sports competitions hosted by Slovakia
Marathon European Championships
Canoeing and kayaking competitions in Slovakia